Cryptophasa panleuca is a moth in the family Xyloryctidae. It was described by Oswald Bertram Lower in 1901. It is found in Australia, where it has been recorded from Queensland.

The wingspan is 31–44 mm. The forewings are white without markings. The hindwings are shining snow white and there is a row of black dots along the termen.

The larvae feed on Lophostemon species.

References

Cryptophasa
Moths described in 1901